Agriomelissa ursipes is a moth of the family Sesiidae. It is known from Somalia and South Africa.

References

Sesiidae
Moths of Africa
Fauna of Somalia
Moths described in 1856